Yuh may refer to:

People

Yuh Hwan-kil (1962–2009), South Korean boxer
Yuh Jae-doo (born 1948), South Korean boxer
Ji-Yeon Yuh, American academic
Yuh Myung-woo (born 1964), South Korean boxer
Jennifer Yuh Nelson (born 1972), American film director

Music
"Get Into It (Yuh)", a 2021 song by Doja Cat